Daryna Volodymyrivna Duda (born 29 November 2003) is a Ukrainian group rhythmic gymnast. She was the second youngest athlete who represented Ukraine at the 2020 Summer Olympics.

References

External links 
 

2003 births
Living people
Gymnasts from Kyiv
Ukrainian rhythmic gymnasts
Gymnasts at the 2020 Summer Olympics
Olympic gymnasts of Ukraine
21st-century Ukrainian women